George Passmore (5 August 1852 – 8 February 1935) was an English first-class cricketer. Passmore was a right-handed batsman who played primarily as a wicket-keeper.

Passmore made a single first-class appearance for Hampshire in 1896 against Yorkshire. In the match, batting at number eleven, Passmore was dismissed for a duck by Bobby Peel. Behind the stumps Passmore made two catches and a single stumping.

Passmore died in Oreston, Devon on 8 February 1935.

External links
George Passmore at Cricinfo
George Passmore at CricketArchive

1852 births
1935 deaths
People from South Hams (district)
English cricketers
Hampshire cricketers
Cricketers from Devon